This is a list of women that have entered at least one World Rally Championship event. 
This list does not include co-drivers.

All WRC women drivers

As of April 2022 (2022 Croatia Rally).

See also
List of World Rally Championship drivers

References

World Rally Championship
World Rally Championship
Female
Female World Rally Championship drivers